Smith (stylized as SMITH, née Dorothée Smith; born 1985) is a French visual artist, known for explorations in the matter of gender, transgender and absence.

Early life and education
Born as Dorothée Smith in 1985 in Paris, France. Smith has also studied at the Paris-Sorbonne University (2007), and the Aalto University (2009) in Helsinki.

Smith was in an artist residency at Le Fresnoy (National Studio of Contemporary Arts) in Tourcoing, France, from 2010 to 2012.

Work 
Smith's initial artistic medium was photography; later installations include a variety of media. His work, both plastic and theoretical, is now described as "indisciplinary". Smith has engaged in collaborations with scientific and philosophical research teams and labs - such as the French National Centre for Scientific Research in 2012, and the IRAP (Institut de recherche en astrophysique et planétologie) in 2018.

In the interactive installation "Cellulairement" (2012), a thermal capture device in the installation space was connected to an electronic chip implanted in Smith's body, allowing Smith to feel the presence of viewers.

Many of Smith's works explore questions of gender and personal identity. The idea of transition is a central element of his artistic practice. French photographer and photography specialist Arnaud Claass wrote about Smith's work, in the preface of Smith's first monographic book: "There is no mystery; SMITH's approach to the visible, at once luminarist and dark, is valid as an image of the uncertainty of sexual roles. Questions of gender, a current in philosophy over the last twenty years or more, occupy an important place in the intellectual development of [Smith's] oeuvre."

His most recent projects are "Spectrographies" (2014), "TRAUM" (2015–18), "Saturnium" (2017) and "Desideration" (2019). They were presented during cinema festivals in Europe, at the Centre Pompidou and Théâtre de la Cité Internationale (Paris), at the CND (Pantin), at the Dance Museum (Rennes) and at the CCN-ICI (Montpellier).

SMITH's visual works were exhibited as solo shows at the Rencontres Internationales de la Photographie (Arles), at the Filles du Calvaire gallery and Palais de Tokyo (Paris), at the Photographic Museum of Helsinki (Finland), as well as several countries in Europe (Sweden, Luxembourg, Germany, Spain, Italy, Austria, Switzerland), Asia (China, Cambodia, South Korea) and Latin America (Mexico, Chile, Uruguay).

Publications
His first book, "Löyly" (Filigranes) was published in 2013, followed by "Saturnium" (Actes Sud) in 2017, a long-length interview by art historian Christine Ollier in 2017, "Juste entre nous" (André Frère), the opera booklet "Astroblème" (Filigranes), and the traval-photobook "Valparaiso" (André Frère).
 Dorothée Smith (préf. Arnaud Claass), Löyly & Sub Limis, Le Château d’Eau, 26 January 2011
 Dorothée Smith et Dominique Baqué, Löyly, Filigranes, 14 November 2013, 192 p.
 SMITH, Antonin Tri Hoang, Jean-Philippe Uzan, Claire Moulène et Alain Fleischer, Saturnium - Conte musical et photographique, Musicales Actes Sud, 6 September 2017, 68 p. (ISBN 3149028113723)
 Christine Ollier, SMITH, André Frère Éditions, 10 November 2017, 128 p.
 SMITH, Astroblème, Coffret "1+2 L'origine manquante", Filigranes

Solo exhibitions
 2008–2009: galerie AnnexOne, galerie Dask, Copenhague
 2009: Nuit Blanche, Chapelle de la maternité Sainte Croix, Metz, avec une performance de Sir Alice
 2011: Sub Limis, galerie du Château d'eau de Toulouse, Toulouse
 2012–2013: "Hear us marching up slowly", Rencontres d'Arles; Photospring Festival of Caochangdi, Chine (commissaire : Didier de Faÿs)
 2015: Entre deux fantômes, Pavillon Vendôme, Clichy
 2016: Давайте Мечтать, galerie les Filles du Calvaire, Paris
 2017: TRAUM, Patricia Conde Galeria, Mexico, Mexique; Institut Chorégraphique International, Montpellier (commissaire : Christian Rizzo)
 2018: Spectrographies, San José foto Festival, Uruguay

Selected works
 2009 Löyly, series of photographs
 2010 Sub Limis, series of photographs
 2011 C19H28O2 (Agnès), video installation
 2012 Spectrographies, interactive installation
 2015 TRAUM, transdisciplinary project (danse, cinema, sculpture, photography, performance)
 2017 Saturnium, series of photographs

References

External links
 

1985 births
New media artists
French mixed-media artists
Living people
Artists from Paris
BioArtists
Transgender artists
Non-binary artists
Transgender non-binary people